Andries Ebenaezer Swanepoel (born 19 February 1993) is a South African rugby union professional player for the  in the Pro14 and the  in the Currie Cup. His regular position is centre.

Career

Youth

This led to his inclusion in the South African Schools side in 2011, where he also acted as vice-captain.

He made four starts for them in the 2012 Under-19 Provincial Championship competition, scoring three tries. In 2013, he earned a call-up to the South Africa Under-20 side that played in the 2013 IRB Junior World Championship. After making substitute appearances against the United States and England, he started the final pool match against France – scoring a first-minute try to help them top their pool – and the semi-final loss to Wales.

He returned to domestic action at the end of the year, scoring five tries in fourteen appearances for the  side in the 2013 Under-21 Provincial Championship.

He played for university side  during the 2014 Varsity Cup, scoring six tries in six starts.

Blue Bulls

Swanepoel's first class debut came in the 2013 Vodacom Cup competition. He started in their match against  in Kimberley It took him just eleven minutes to score his first senior try, setting Blue Bulls on their way to a 40–32 win. He made a further five appearances in the competition, scoring a total of six tries, the joint seventh-highest in the competition.

Cheetahs

In July 2018, Swanepoel returned to the  prior to the 2018–19 Pro14, signing a two-year deal with the Bloemfontein-based side.

References

1993 births
Living people
People from Tswaing Local Municipality
South African rugby union players
Blue Bulls players
Rugby union centres
South Africa Under-20 international rugby union players
Bulls (rugby union) players
Free State Cheetahs players
Cheetahs (rugby union) players
AS Béziers Hérault players
Rugby union players from North West (South African province)